Leucopogon cucullatus is a flowering plant in the family Ericaceae and is endemic to the south-west of Western Australia. Flowering occurs from July to January.  

Leucopogon cucullatus was first formally described in 1810 by Robert Brown in his Prodromus Florae Novae Hollandiae. The specific epithet (cucullatus) means "hooded", referring to the leaves. 

This leucopogon grows on sandy and gravelly soils in the Avon Wheatbelt, Esperance Plains, Jarrah Forest and Warren bioregions of south-western Western Australia.

References 

cucullatus
Ericales of Australia
Flora of Western Australia
Plants described in 1810
Taxa named by Robert Brown (botanist, born 1773)